Kathy Walsh may refer to:

Kathy Walsh (horse trainer), of Sarah's Secret
Kathy Walsh, character in The Alphabet Killer
Cathy Walsh (camogie) in All-Ireland Senior Club Camogie Championship 1985

See also
Catherine Walsh (disambiguation)
Kathleen Walsh (disambiguation)